The 2014 Race of Champions was the 26th running of the event, and took place over 13–14 December 2014 at Bushy Park circuit in Barbados. The Nations' Cup was won by the Nordic team of Tom Kristensen and Petter Solberg, while the individual contest was won by David Coulthard, who beat Pascal Wehrlein 2–0 in the final. Barbados won the inaugural ROC Caribbean competition.

Participants

The reigning Champion of Champions, Romain Grosjean, was invited to take part, along with the last edition's defeated finalist, nine-time Le Mans winner Tom Kristensen. Grosjean was the only active Formula One race driver to take part, although Williams test driver Susie Wolff, GP2 champion Jolyon Palmer, Mercedes test driver Pascal Wehrlein and European F3 champion Esteban Ocon all had experience of Formula One machinery, while David Coulthard was a 13-time Grand Prix winner.

Other champions participating included José María López (WTCC), Ryan Hunter-Reay (IndyCar), Jamie Whincup (V8 Supercars), Petter Solberg (WRC and World Rallycross), Kurt Busch (NASCAR) and Mick Doohan (MotoGP).

López, Ocon, Wolff, Busch, Palmer and Wehrlein all made their Race of Champions debuts, along with the eight ROC Caribbean drivers, while Solberg and Robby Gordon both returned after lengthy absences.

For the first time since the inception of the Nations' Cup event in 1999, there was no German team, Wehrlein the sole German representative in attendance. This means that there was guaranteed to be a non-German winning team for the first time since 2006. The French, United States and Nordic (as Scandinavia) teams were the only former victors participating, while Argentina and Barbados gained representation for the first time.

Nations' Cup

ROC Caribbean

As the fastest Barbadian and non-Barbadian respectively, Rhett Watson and Doug Gore advanced to the main competition.

Cars
Seven vehicles were used throughout the event. The Ariel Atom Cup, Stadium Super Truck and Volkswagen Polo RX car made their debut, while the Toyota GT-86, Lamborghini Gallardo Super Trofeo and Volkswagen Scirocco were all dropped.

 Ariel Atom Cup
 Audi R8 LMS
 KTM X-Bow
 Chevrolet Camaro (Whelen Euro Series)
 ROC Car
 Stadium Super Truck
 Volkswagen Polo RX

Nations Cup

Drivers who made a false start or hit a wall are marked with a yellow card  in the tables, and a time penalty of 5 seconds was added to their original time.

Group A

Group B

Knockout stage

Semifinals

Finals

ROC Caribbean

Group stage

Final

Race of Champions

Group A

Group B

Group C

Group D

Knockout stage

Quarterfinals

Semifinals

Final

References

External links 

 

Race of Champions
Race of Champions
Race of Champions
Race of Champions
Race of Champions
International sports competitions hosted by Barbados